Nipponagonum is a genus of ground beetles in the family Carabidae. There are about six described species in Nipponagonum, found in eastern Asia.

Species
These six species belong to the genus Nipponagonum:
 Nipponagonum amphinomus (Bates, 1883)  (Japan)
 Nipponagonum askellek (Morvan, 1998)  (China)
 Nipponagonum hakonum (Harold, 1878)  (Japan)
 Nipponagonum meridies (Habu, 1975)  (China, Japan, and Taiwan)
 Nipponagonum minamikawai (Habu, 1959)  (Japan)
 Nipponagonum nepalense Morvan, 1998  (Nepal)

References

Platyninae